"Anything but Down" is a song by American singer-songwriter Sheryl Crow. Released as the third single from her third studio album, The Globe Sessions (1998), it fared better than its predecessor "There Goes the Neighborhood" in the United States, reaching number 49 on the Billboard Hot 100 and number seven on the Billboard Adult Contemporary chart. The song also reached number 11 in Canada and number 19 in the United Kingdom.

Music video
The video for this single was directed by Floria Sigismondi, and was later released on the DVD of the CD/DVD release of The Very Best of Sheryl Crow.

Track listings
US 7-inch single
A. "Anything but Down" – 4:18
B. "The Difficult Kind" – 6:19

UK CD1
 "Anything but Down" (LP version) – 4:18
 "Leaving Las Vegas" (live in Toronto) – 5:33
 "Mississippi" (live) – 3:38

UK CD2
 "Anything but Down" (LP version) – 4:18
 "Run Baby Run" (live in Milan) – 3:40
 "Riverwide" (live for Wise Buddah) – 4:13

Credits and personnel
Credits are lifted from The Globe Sessions album booklet.

Studios
 Recorded at Globe Studios (New York City) and Sunset Sound Factory (Los Angeles)
 Mixed at Sunset Sound Factory (Los Angeles) and Soundtracks (New York City)
 Mastered at Gateway Mastering (Portland, Maine, US)

Personnel

 Sheryl Crow – writing, vocals, acoustic guitar, production
 Jeff Trott – electric guitar
 Greg Leisz – pedal steel guitar
 Dan Rothchild – bass
 Benmont Tench – piano
 Dan McCarroll – drums
 Trina Shoemaker – recording
 Huksy Hoskolds – additional recording
 Andy Wallace – mixing
 Bob Ludwig – mastering

Charts

Weekly charts

Year-end charts

References

1998 songs
1999 singles
A&M Records singles
Music videos directed by Floria Sigismondi
Polydor Records singles
Sheryl Crow songs
Songs written by Sheryl Crow